The 2014 Brown Bears football team represented Brown University in the 2015 NCAA Division I FCS football season. They were led by 18th-year head coach Phil Estes and played their home games at Brown Stadium. They were a member of the Ivy League. Brown has a record of 5–5 in the season with a 3–4 mark in Ivy League play to finish in a tie for fourth place. Brown averaged 4,822 fans per gam.

Schedule

References

Brown
Brown Bears football seasons
Brown Bears football